Aul Palace (Odia: ଆଳି ରାଜବାଟୀ) is situated near Aul, Odisha, Kendrapara, India. It is the official palace of the Deb dynasty who ruled here from 1590 A.D.

In 2018, a plan to turn a wing of the palace into a heritage hotel was initiated by members of the Aul royal family.

Nearby tourist spots
 Kanika Palace
 Bhitarkanika National Park
 Lakhmi Varaha Temple
 Akhandalamani Temple

See also

 Pattamundai
 Kendrapara

References

Palaces in Odisha